King of the Mountain is a 1980 board game published by Dimension Six.

Gameplay
King of the Mountain is a game in which the wizard Promonthorius tries to kill anyone who attempts to climb the Citadel at the Peak, using the creatures throughout the mountain to attack them.

Reception
David Ladyman reviewed King of the Mountain in The Space Gamer No. 36. Ladyman commented that "King of the Mountain has several commendable features; it is certainly a playable game."

References

Board games introduced in 1980